Gillellus searcheri, the Searcher stargazer, is a species of sand stargazer native to the Pacific coast of the Americas from Mexico to Panama where they prefer areas with sandy substrates at depths of from .  It can reach a maximum length of  TL. The specific name honours the research vessel Searcher, the type being collected aboard this vessel.

References

External links
 Photograph

searcheri
Fish described in 1977
Taxa named by Charles Eric Dawson